Steering system may refer to:

 Steering
 Steering linkage
 Active steering
 Power steering